RTP2 (RTP dois) is a Portuguese free-to-air television channel owned and operated by state-owned public broadcaster Rádio e Televisão de Portugal (RTP). It is the company's second television channel, and is known for broadcasting cultural, factual and children's programming without interruptions, including documentaries, concerts, theatre and independent, European and classic cinema.

It was launched on 25 December 1968 as the second regular television service in Portugal right after RTP's first channel was launched on 7 March 1957. Two regional channels followed, RTP Madeira on 6 August 1972 and RTP Açores on 10 August 1975. As RTP held a monopoly on television broadcasting in the country, they were the only television channels until the first commercial television was launched on 6 October 1992, when SIC started broadcasting nationwide.

Commonly referred as the "Second" (O Segundo), and for a time rebranded as "Dois" (Portuguese for two), it is nowadays referred to as RTP2.

Similar to BBC Two, RTP2 aims at less mainstream and more intellectual content. RTP2 is the only of several Portuguese and European national/international channels that has a strict cultural and educational programming (comparable to Arte). RTP2 is the only broadcaster from Portugal that broadcasts programming without interruptions, ad breaks or in line messaging. Together with sister channel RTP1, it became a 24-hour service in 2005. RTP2's line-up is devoted to worldwide recognized quality television content, institutional EU/national programming or advertising, television series, cinematography, documentary films, theatre and classical music. As of 2007, its share of the national audience was 5%-7%.

History
RTP studied the hypothesis of launching a second channel in 1967, these plans went into fruition in 1968. The service (going under the unofficial name of II Programa) began broadcasting on 25 December 1968 on the UHF band, broadcasting to large urban centres, simply relaying programming from the first network over the course of two hours every night. In 1969, the channel had 1012 hours of operation, living upon repeats from the main service.

Regular broadcasts started on 21 November 1970. In 1971, the channel added an extra hour to its daily schedule, now starting at 20:30. As the 1970s progressed, the channel slowly started to add (predominantly European) shows on the schedule that RTP1 did not air.

On 16 October 1978, RTP decided to separate RTP-1 and RTP/2, giving each channel their own teams and news operations. Fernando Lopes became the controller of the newly-separate channel, being nicknamed as "Canal Lopes" (the Lopes channel).

Towards the start of the 80s, owing to cost-cutting measures, RTP 2 was now under RTP 1's control again.

In 1986, the channel was part of the Europa TV experiment, airing the channel's programming between 16:30 and 20:00. As soon as Europa TV closed, some Music Box shows were relayed on the channel. Agora Escolha premiered in the same year, a phone-in show which allowed the viewer to choose from two different TV shows. It got cancelled in the mid-90s, apart from a brief (and web-centric) revival in 2011 on RTP Memória.

On 17 September 1990, RTP 2 was renamed Canal 2, then to TV2 on 14 September 1992. As TV2, the channel's slogan was A Outra TV.

In 1994, TV2 was forced to focus entirely on minorities, causing major changes to the channel's schedule. High-profile football matches and telenovelas were transferred from TV2 to the more mainstream channel, Canal 1 and the channel's ratings started to vertiginously decrease.

On 29 April 1996, the channel's name reverted to RTP2, carrying the same scheduling format as TV2. The channel started to relay Euronews in Portuguese at certain times.

Commercial advertising was now prohibited towards the new millennium.

On 5 January 2004, the channel renamed once again, becoming 2:, pronounced a dois (the two). As a result, the channel was now forced to focus on children's programming, cultural interests and the civil society.

Logos and identities

1968-1977

1977-1979
RTP2 began a 12-year period of changing logos alongside its sister channel RTP1, and that's why these two channels were changing their logos as well as their on-air identities at overall for a lot of various times. Obviously, RTP2 were adopting a new logo as a separate entity in October 1977, and it were consisting of a stylish-lowercased rtp wordmark alongside the 2-numeral that is formed out of the letter t, because this logo is so famous for appearing on Zé Gato, that had been aired on RTP2.

1979-1981
Sometimes when RTP's two TV channels commenced a 5-year period of sharing their same logo format with some different colors, RTP2 began to use a new logo on 14 June 1979, and eventually, its new logo were the same than RTP1's new logo, but the RTP1 wordmark are instead replaced with the RTP2 wordmark, because this logo is colored with yellow, so that's why yellow will be RTP2's favorite color.

1981-March 1983
In February 1981, RTP2 got a new logo again and it were the same than RTP1's logo, but the 1-numeral are instead replaced with a red 2-numeral, especially that the RTP wordmark are appearing under the 2-numeral although it is also colored with red.

March–July 1983
Later, on 21 March 1983, RTP2 adopted another new logo which is same than RTP1's new logo, and by that, this new logo came up with an ident that contains some music which is a crescendoing synthesizer tune that is sounding very similar to THX's Deep Note.

July–October 1983

October 1983-1984

1984-1985
In the spring of 1984, RTP2 were launching yet another new logo that is similar to RTP1's new logo, but eventually, the 1-numeral are still again replaced by the 2-numeral while it is beside to the "RTP" wordmark, although it is using the Sinaloa typeface while appearing inside a rectangle.

1985-1986
From December 1985, RTP2 got a new logo that consists of a red 2-numeral that is drawn out of three lines while the RTP wordmark are colored with royal blue although it is underneath the symbol, but the RTP wordmark were soon adopted on RTP's logo within the following year.

1986-1988
On 13 October 1986, RTP2 were again getting another new logo that gets changed into a rounded rectangle which has the RTP wordmark appearing to the left of the side of the 2-numeral.

1988-1990
On 2 December 1988, RTP2 were yet again relaunching its on-air identity with a new logo that consists of a 2-numeral which is formed up of three lines that is colored red, green, and purple, although they are forming a larger 2-numeral which will contain a picture that can be seen from the transitory phase which will lead into RTP2's next on-air identity.

1990-1992
On 17 September 1990, RTP2 introduced a new logo which consists of a 2-numeral that is supposed to be an permanent, white and opaque DOG, although it depicts a handwritten "2"-numeral, and it were eventually coming up with some idents that consists of mainly on several fruit chopped in the middle by the logo, though it gets accompanied by synthesized pieces of music, and besides, there is also a startup ident which consists of something for what it should look like a chalkboard that is drawing of a line which will enter into a TV set until it later forms the logo, but there is also a closedown ident which consist of an animation with the same style that has been used for why it is focusing on the Portuguese discoveries, and that's how it were used as RTP2's anthem film during its on-air identity.

1992-1996
Later, on 14 September 1992, RTP2 became rebranded as RTP TV2, and by that, it introduced a new logo which is based on a stylized yellow-colored stripe that is forming a "2"-numeral, while it is beside to two pieces of quartz that is forming the word "TV", and however, this logo came up with some various idents that are featuring at that time some prominently yellow stripes, but in 1994, the graphics were slightly changing to a yellow background with some various stripes, but the logo were remaining the same.

1995-2003
On 29 April 1996, to coincide with the implementing of RTP's new corporate logo, RTP TV2 decided to revive its original name, and so, it were reverting its name back to its original brand as RTP2, thus getting a new logo which consists of a white "2"-numeral that is inside a light-orange-colored background along with the "RTP" wordmark which is underneath in white color, although it is overlaid in a dark blue background, as RTP2's new-looking idents are consisting of mainly on the logo that is flashed on several themes such as typewriters, stripes (a reference to the previous identity), and some dancing people, although these idents are getting accompanied by RTP2's orchestral tune with some prominent arrangements of a harp, violin and cello, but these idents along with the channel's overall imagery are continuing to be, by far, one of the most original and creative ever made on Portuguese television, so later, on 12 October 1998, RTP2 redesigned its 1996 identity with a new look that is designed by Thomas Sabel at Novocom, and it will especially give an predominance to the actual people by adding the green color into its color scheme, and besides, from 2000, they were later changed into simply-looking graphics that are designed by BBC Broadcast, but these graphics were only used for promos and the 1998 idents continued to be used. The 2000 graphics were short-lived because they are lasting a short use until 2002 when RTP2 updates a new logo.

2001-2003
On 28 October 2001, RTP2 were again upgrading a new logo alongside its sister channel RTP1, but this identity are only using one single ident that is used during the lifetime of this logo, and it consists of a representation of RTP2's logo in a white flash, with a dark orange background.

2004-2007
On 5 January 2004 at 21:00, RTP2 dropped its RTP2 brand and were instead changing its name to "2:", so thus, at the same time, its identity and concept becomes replaced by a digital green-colored 2-numeral that is beside to the ":", although this logo will be the new name for the channel, especially that the "2:" idents are becoming computer-generated with CGI, while being accompanied by the new 2:-tune that contains some electronic and classical music, with some prominent piano arrangements. This logo will look like Nine Network's logo.

2007-2016

On 19 March 2007, 2: retired its "2:" brand, and by that, it were reverting its channel name back to the original name as RTP2, thus reviving the "RTP2" brand, but at the same time for resurrecting the RTP2's original name, it implemented a new logo by adopting some new idents that continues to become computer-generated CGIs with a lot of vertical stripes in their various forms as the main theme.

2016-present
On 10 May 2016 at 21:00, RTP2 launched its current logo along with a new on-screen look, as well as new idents that use yellow, RTP2's signature color.

Current programmes

News 

 Jornal 2

Talk shows
70x7 (religious talk-show)
A Fé dos Homens (religious talk-show)
Bairro Alto (arts talk-show)
Sociedade Civil (different areas debate talk-show)

Magazines
Arquitectarte (architecture magazine)
Artes de Rua (street arts, magazine)
Bastidores (cinema magazine)
Biosfera (environment and ecology magazine)
Câmara Clara (arts magazine)
Agora (arts magazine)
Couto & Coutadas (hunt magazine)
Da Terra ao Mar (agriculture magazine)
Iniciativa (business development magazine)
Universidades (universities magazine)
Vida por Vida (fire fighters magazine)

Debate
Clube de Jornalistas (journalism debate)
Diga lá Excelência (debate)
Eurodeputados (eurodeputy's debate)
Olhar o Mundo (international news debate)
Parlamento (deputy's debate)

Others

Consigo (program)
Nós (immigration program)
Café Central
A Noite do Óscar

Sports

Blocks
Zig Zag (children, teens' and young people's block broadcast on weekdays from 07:00 to 10:47 and 17:00 to 20:49 and weekends from 08:00 to 13:30 (Saturday)/13:00 (Sunday).

Imported shows

Animated shows
 Cro
 Foofur
 Funnybones
 Pinkalicious & Peterrific (La Rose de Curioso La) (upcoming)

Children's Programmes
 Chicken Minute
 Johnson and Friends
 Lift Off
Animaniacs
Clifford the Big Red Dog Clifford, o Cão Vermelho (2000)
Clifford the Big Red Dog (2019) Clifford, o Cão Vermelho

References

External links
Official Site 
 RTP2 Live Stream on RTP Play

Television stations in Portugal
Portuguese-language television stations
Television channels and stations established in 1968
1968 establishments in Portugal
Rádio e Televisão de Portugal